System 7 or System/7 may refer to:

Computing
 IBM System/7, a minicomputer developed by IBM; premiered in 1971

Operating systems: 

 Macintosh System 7, the Apple operating system introduced in 1991
 Operating System/7, the UNIVAC operating system introduced in 1974
 System Manager 7, a successor to Multiuser DOS by Datapac
 Version 7 Unix, otherwise known as (Unix Time Sharing) System 7; released in 1979

Other
 System 7 (album), eponymous, debut studio album of System 7; released in 1991
 System 7 (band), a British electronic music duo
 Signalling System 7, telephony signaling protocols
 System 7 Napoleonics, tabletop miniatures wargaming
 STS-7 (Space Transportation System-7), the Space Shuttle mission

See also
 Series 7 (disambiguation)